Abbad ibn al-Ghamr al-Shihabi (also known as Abbad ibn Umar) was a ninth century governor of the Yemen for the Abbasid Caliphate.

A local Yemeni chief, Abbad was placed in charge of Sana'a by Muhammad ibn Abdallah ibn Muhriz in 824, and he held power there until the arrival of the governor Ishaq ibn al-Abbas ibn Muhammad al-Hashimi at the end of the year. Following the death of the caliph al-Ma'mun in 833, Abbad was again appointed over the Yemen by Abdallah ibn Ubaydallah ibn al-Abbas, and he was confirmed as governor by the new caliph al-Mu'tasim (r. 833–842). He remained in the governorship until the end of 835, when he was replaced by Abd al-Rahim ibn Ja'far ibn Sulayman al-Hashimi.

Notes

References 
 
 
 

Abbasid governors of Yemen
9th-century Arabs
9th-century people from the Abbasid Caliphate
9th century in Yemen